The following is a list of sports venues in the U.S. State of North Carolina. Venues are separated into three categories: Arenas, race tracks, and stadiums. Each category may be sorted by venue name, location, tenant or usage, or capacity.

Current

Arenas

Notes

Race tracks

Stadiums

References

North Carolina
venues
Sports